The 2019–20 Tunisian Ligue Professionnelle 1 (Tunisian Professional League) season is the 94th season of top-tier football in Tunisia.

The season was suspended in March 2020, due to COVID-19 pandemic in Tunisia, then resumed in August 2020.

Teams
A total of 14 teams will contest the league.

Stadiums and locations

League table

Results

Positions by round

Clubs season-progress

Season statistics

Top scorers

Hat-tricks

Media coverage

See also
2019–20 Tunisian Ligue Professionnelle 2
2019–20 Tunisian Cup

References

External links
 2019–20 Ligue 1 on RSSSF.com
 Fédération Tunisienne de Football

Tunisian Ligue Professionnelle 1 seasons
Tunisia
1
Tunisian Ligue Professionnelle 1, 2019-20